Rio Grande Dub, alternatively titled Rio Grande Dub-Ya, is a remix album by industrial metal band Ministry. The album is composed of remixes from the band's 2006 album Rio Grande Blood. John Bechdel is responsible for the "Fear Is Big Business (Weapons of Mass Deception Mix)". The rest of the remixes on this album were done by Clayton Worbeck.

Track listing

Track 12 is a Japan-only bonus track

References

2007 remix albums
Albums produced by Al Jourgensen
Ministry (band) albums
Industrial remix albums
Cultural depictions of George W. Bush